Closer is the fourth studio album by English pop singer Shayne Ward. It was released on 12 April 2015, as Ward's first independent release, funded through PledgeMusic. The album marks the debut release from MPG, a joint venture between Ward and music producer Mike Stock. The album features writing credits by Ward, Stock, Laura Walton and Johan Kalel, with production provided exclusively by Stock and Jimmy Junior. Recording took place between 2014 and 2015 in Stock's West Sussex studio.

Background
In 2011, it was reported that Syco Music had not renewed their recording contract with Ward due to the relative commercial failure of his third studio album, Obsession. It was announced in 2014 that Shayne will release his fourth album with Mike Stock and PledgeMusic. Stock confirmed that the entire album was recorded and produced using solar power.

Singles
The first single "My Heart Would Take You Back" premiered on BBC Radio 2 on the Ken Bruce show on 24 February 2015 to a positive reception. Shayne Ward said of the song: "I sat down with Mike and said, 'I love The Stylistics, Temptations, The Chi-Lites and I would love to write something along the lines of that. I thought it would end up as an album track but from the moment we sent it to management, they jumped at it and said, 'We have to go with this as the lead track.'"

A video for "The Way You Were" was released on 2 June 2015 with remixes due for release on 21 June.

Track listing

Charts

Release history

References 

2015 albums
Shayne Ward albums